Sana Maksutovna Anarkulova (née Jarlagassova, born 21 July 1989) is a Kazakhstani volleyball player. She is a member of the Kazakhstan women's national volleyball team and played for Zhetysu Almaty in 2014. She was part of the Kazakhstani national team  at the 2010 FIVB Volleyball Women's World Championship in Japan. and at the 2014 FIVB Volleyball Women's World Championship in Italy.

During the 2018 Asian Games Sana Anarkulova scored 15 markers against the Philippines, beating them 25-11, 22-25, 25-15, 19-25, 16-14.

Clubs
 Almaty (2010)
 Zhetysu Almaty (2014)
 Altay VC (2015–present)

References

1989 births
Living people
Kazakhstani women's volleyball players
Asian Games medalists in volleyball
Volleyball players at the 2010 Asian Games
Medalists at the 2010 Asian Games
Asian Games bronze medalists for Kazakhstan
Place of birth missing (living people)
Volleyball players at the 2018 Asian Games
21st-century Kazakhstani women